Monura is an extinct suborder of wingless insects in the order Archaeognatha. They resembled their modern relatives, the silverfish, and had a single lengthy filament projecting from the end of the abdomen. They also had a pair of leg-like cerci and some non-ambulatory abdominal appendages. The largest specimens reached  or more, not counting the length of the filament.

Taxonomy
 Suborder †Monura Sharov 1957 stat. nov. Carpenter 1992
 Family †Dasyleptidae Sharov 1957
 Genus †Tonganoxichnus Mángano et al. 1997 (ichnotaxa)
 Genus †Dasyleptus Brongniart 1885

References

Entognatha
Carboniferous insects
Pennsylvanian insects
Permian insects
Paleozoic insects of North America
Carboniferous animals of North America
Permian animals of North America
Extinct insect orders
Pennsylvanian first appearances
Permian extinctions